Joe Lovett (18 October 1902 – 26 May 1949) was an Australian rules footballer who played with North Melbourne and Essendon in the Victorian Football League (VFL).

Notes

External links 
		

1902 births
1949 deaths
Australian rules footballers from Victoria (Australia)
North Melbourne Football Club players
Essendon Football Club players